Kiss the Future is a compilation album by British singer Mark Stewart, released on 30 May 2005 through Soul Jazz Records.

Track listing

Personnel 
Duncan Cowell – mastering
Pete Reilly – mastering
Mark Stewart – vocals

References

External links 
 

2005 compilation albums
Mark Stewart (English musician) albums
Soul Jazz Records compilation albums